Pico Bolívar is the highest mountain in Venezuela, at 4,978 metres (16,332 ft). Located in Mérida State, its top is permanently covered with névé snow and three small glaciers. It can be reached only by walking; the Mérida cable car, which was the highest and longest cable car in the world when it was built, only reaches Pico Espejo. From there it is possible to climb to Pico Bolívar. The peak is named after the Venezuelan independence hero Simón Bolívar.

The Pico Bolívar is located on the mountain previously called La Columna, next to El León (4,743 m) and El Toro (4,695 m). The new name was suggested by Tulio Febres Cordero in 1925. It was officially renamed on December 30, 1934.

Elevation 
The height of this prominent Andean peak has been estimated and calculated various times during history.

During the 1990s, the scientists Heinz Saler and Carlso Abad calculated the height, based upon GPS observations to be . However, no validation was made. New GPS measurements were made in 2002,  which stated a height of 4,978.4 ±0.4 metres. These more correct findings were published in 2005.

The final measurement was made by José Napoleon Hernández from IGVSB; Diego Deiros and Carlos Rodriguez from USB and two guides from Inparques. GPS measurements  designed for geodetic network consists of the vertices Pico Bolívar, El Toro, Piedras Blancas, and Mucuñuque Observatory, the latter belonging to the Venezuelan Red Geocentric REGVEN. Measurements were temporally equally long and continuous to ensure a greater volume of data over time to make more consistent and reliable information, five (5) GPS dual frequency receivers were used.

Glacial retreat

During the Merida glaciation in the Pleistocene epoch, the glaciated area had a maximum extent of 600 km2 and covered mountains with a height of at least . At the end of the glaciation, the area covered by the glaciers progressively shrank, and before the start of the Little Ice Age they had possibly all disappeared.

Possibly a small glaciated area covered the northwest side of Pico El Toro.<ref>[http://www.saber.ula.ve/bitstream/123456789/26199/1/articulo22.pdf "Efectos del calentamiento global ¿Nieves eternas en la Sierra Nevada de Mérida?] </ref>

References
 Pérez O, Hoyer M, Hernández J, Rodríguez C, Márques V, Sué N, Velandia J, Deiros D. (2005). "Alturas del Pico Bolívar y otras cimas andinas venezolanas a partir de observaciones GPS" Interciencia. 30 (4). 
 Jahn, A. "Observaciones glaciológicas de los Andes venezolanos" Cult. Venez.'' 1925, 64:265-80

Notes

External links

 "Pico Bolívar, Venezuela" on Peakbagger

Bolivar
Glaciers of Venezuela
Geography of Mérida (state)
Highest points of countries
Four-thousanders of the Andes
Sierra Nevada National Park (Venezuela)
Extreme points of Venezuela